The 1996 London Broncos season was the seventeenth in the club's history and their first season in the Super League. Coached by Tony Currie, the Broncos competed in Super League I and finished in 4th place. The club also reached the fourth round of the Challenge Cup.

Super League table

Super League Play Offs

Squad
Statistics include appearances and points in the Super League, Challenge Cup and Premiership Trophy.

References

External links
London Broncos - Rugby League Project

London Broncos seasons
London Broncos